Svojšice is a municipality and village in Kolín District in the Central Bohemian Region of the Czech Republic. It has about 500 inhabitants.

Administrative parts
Villages of Bošice and Nová Ves III is an administrative part of Svojšice.

References

Villages in Kolín District